Mark W. Moses (born February 24, 1958) is an American actor, best known for his roles as Paul Young in the ABC comedy-drama Desperate Housewives (2004–2011) and as Herman "Duck" Phillips in the AMC period drama Mad Men (2007–2014).

Early life
Moses was born in New York City, and grew up in Evanston, Illinois. His father worked in advertising on Madison Avenue while they lived in New York. He has stated that he drew inspiration from his father when he landed the role of Duck Phillips on the hit show Mad Men. Moses's parents moved to Saint Louis, Missouri while he was still in high school, so he stayed with family friends in Evanston to finish high school there. 

Moses attended Evanston Township High School where he was quarterback of the school's varsity football team. He then enrolled at Ithaca College in Ithaca, New York, where he majored in English. Moses dropped out after a year to travel. He later enrolled at New York University, where he graduated with a degree in theater.

Career
Moses began his career appearing in the ABC daytime soap opera One Life to Live in 1983. Also in 1983, he appeared in the Broadway production of The Slab Boys Trilogy starring Kevin Bacon and Sean Penn. He later played Ulysses S. Grant in the ABC miniseries North and South and guest-starred on Family Ties, The Golden Girls and Matlock. Moses also appeared in a number of films by director Oliver Stone, such as Platoon (1986), Born on the Fourth of July (1989) and The Doors (1991).

Moses played supporting roles in a number of movies, including Gettysburg (1993), Deep Impact (1998), One Man's Hero (1999), Big Momma's House 2 (2006), Swing Vote (2008), Cesar Chavez (2014) and Bombshell (2019). His only leading film role was in the 1997 romantic comedy-drama Just in Time directed by Shawn Levy. 

Moses also appeared in several made-for-television movies and was regular cast member in the short-lived sitcoms Grand (1990) and The Single Guy (1995-96). He played Woodbury Kane in the 1997 miniseries Rough Riders and also guest-starred on Touched by an Angel, Star Trek: Voyager, ER, The West Wing, NYPD Blue, Drop Dead Diva, CSI: Crime Scene Investigation, Law & Order: Special Victims Unit, Scandal and Grey's Anatomy.

In 2004, Moses was cast as Paul Young in the ABC mystery comedy-drama series Desperate Housewives. As the disturbed husband of the deceased Mary Alice Young, Paul was a key character in the show's original main mystery. He left the series as regular cast member after two seasons, but still made some guest appearances in the third season. Moses returned to the series as a series regular after appearing briefly in the sixth-season finale, and was a regular through the 2010–11 season. Along with the rest of the cast, he received two Screen Actors Guild Award for Outstanding Performance by an Ensemble in a Comedy Series in 2005 and 2006.

In 2007, Moses joined the cast of AMC period drama series Mad Men playing a recurring role as Herman "Duck" Phillips.  

In 2009, he received another Screen Actors Guild Award, this time for Outstanding Performance by an Ensemble in a Drama Series. The series ended in 2014. In 2012, he had a recurring role in the second season of AMC crime drama The Killing. 

In 2014, he co-starred in the fourth season of the Showtime political drama Homeland playing Dennis Boyd. Moses also had a recurring roles on Manhattan, Man Seeking Woman, Law & Order True Crime and Salvation. He played the recurring roles of President in the TNT series The Last Ship from 2015 to 2018, and in the Telemundo/Netflix La Reina del Sur. In 2020, he was a regular cast member in the Fox crime drama Deputy, which, however, was cancelled after one season.

Filmography

Film

Television

References

External links
 
 

1958 births
Living people
Male actors from New York City
20th-century American male actors
21st-century American male actors
Male actors from Evanston, Illinois
American football quarterbacks
Players of American football from Illinois
American male film actors
American male television actors
People from Studio City, Los Angeles